Next Space is a 1997 sci fi adventure video game developed by the Slovak company Magic Systems and published by Maxtech. It was published in Slovak and Czech language.

References

Science fiction video games